The kasha (or ) is a Japanese yōkai that steals the corpses of those who have died as a result of accumulating evil deeds.

Summary
Kasha are yōkai that would steal corpses from funerals and cemeteries, and what exactly they are is not firmly set, and there are examples all throughout the country. In many cases their true identity is actually a cat yōkai, and it is also said that cats that grow old would turn into this yōkai and that their true identity is actually a nekomata. However, there are other cases where the kasha is depicted as an oni carrying the damned in a cart to hell.

There are tales of kasha in tales like the folktale Neko Danka, and there are similar tales in the Harima Province (now Hyōgo Prefecture). In Yamasaki (now Shisō), there is the tale of the "Kasha-baba".

As a method of protecting corpses from kasha, in Kamikuishiki, Nishiyatsushiro District, Yamanashi Prefecture (now Fujikawaguchiko, Kōfu), at a temple that a kasha is said to live near, a funeral is performed twice, and it is said that by putting a rock inside the coffin for the first funeral, this protects the corpse from being stolen by the kasha. Also, in Yawatahama, Ehime, Ehime prefecture, it is said that leaving a hair razor on top of the coffin would prevent the kasha from stealing the corpse. In Saigō, Higashiusuki District, Miyzaki Prefecture (now Misato), it is said that before a funeral procession, "I will not let baku feed on this (バクには食わせん)" or "I will not let kasha feed on this (火車には食わせん)" is chanted twice. In the village of Kumagaya, Atetsu District, Okayama Prefecture (now Niimi), it is said that a kasha is avoided by playing a myobachi (a traditional Japanese musical instrument).

Japanese folklore often describes the kasha as humanoid cat-demons with the head of a cat or tiger and a burning tail. They are similar to other demons such as Nekomata and Bakeneko and get often interchanged with them. Kashas are said to travel the world on burning chariots or barouches, stealing the corpses of recently deceased humans, which were not yet buried and who had been sinful in life. They bring their souls to hell.

In classics

"Concerning How in the Manor of Ueda, Echigo, at the Time of Funeral, a Lightning Cloud Comes and Steals Corpses" from the "Kiizō Danshū" (奇異雑談集)
In funerals performed in Ueda, Echigo, a kasha appeared during the funeral presence, and attempted to steal the corpse. It is said that this kasha appeared together with harsh lightning and rain, and in the book's illustration, like the raijin, it wears a fundoshi made with a tiger's skin, and is depicted possessing a drum that can cause lightning (refer to image).
"Holy Priest Onyo Himself Rides with a Kasha" from the "Shin Chomonjū (新著聞集)," Chapter Five "Acts of Prayer"
In Bunmei 11, July 2, at the Zōjō-ji, Holy Priest Onyo was greeted by a kasha. This kasha was not an envoy of hell, but rather an envoy of the pure land, and thus here the appearance of a kasha depended on whether or not one believed in the afterlife.
"Looking at a Kasha, Getting Sore at the Waist and Legs, and Collapsing" from the "Shin Chomonjū", Chapter Ten "Strange Events"
It was at the village of Myōganji near Kisai in Bushū. One time, a man named Yasubei who ran an alcohol shop suddenly ran off down a path, shouted "a kasha is coming," and collapsed. By the time the family rushed to him, he had already lost his sanity and was unable to listen to anything said to him and fell asleep. It is said that, ten days later, his lower body started rotting and he died.
"Cutting the Hand of an Ogre in a Cloud at the Place of Funeral" from the "Shin Chomonjū", Chapter Ten "Strange Events"
When a warrior named Matsudaira Gozaemon participated in the funeral procession of his male cousin, thunder began to rumble, and from a dark cloud that covered the sky, a kasha stuck out an arm of one like a bear, and attempted to steal the corpse. When it was cut off by a sword, it was said that the arm had three dreadful nails, and was covered by hair that looked like silver needles.
"A Kasha Seizes and Takes Away an Avaricious Old Woman" from the "Shin Chomonjū", Chapter Fourteen "Calamities"
When a feudal lord of Hizen, the governor of Inaba, Oomura, and several others, were going around the seacoast of Bizen, a black cloud appeared from afar, and echoed a shriek, "ah, how sad (あら悲しや)," and a person's feet stuck out from the cloud. When the governor of Inaba's retinue dragged it down, it turned out to be the corpse of an old woman. When the people in the surroundings were asked about the circumstances, it turned out that the old woman was terribly stingy, and was detested by those around her, but one time when she went outside to go to the bathroom, a black cloud suddenly swooped down and took her away. To the people of that society, it was the deed of a devil called "kasha."
"Kasha" from the "Bōsō Manroku" (茅窓漫録)
It would sometimes happen that in the middle of a funeral procession, rain and wind would suddenly come forth, blow away the coffin, and cause the corpse to be lost, but this was due to how a kasha from hell came to greet it, and caused people to be afraid and feel ashamed. It is said that the kasha would tear up the corpse, hang it on rocks or trees in the mountains. In the book, there are many kasha in Japan and in China, and here it was the deed of a beast called Mōryō (魍魎), and in the illustration, it was written as 魍魎 and given the reading "kuhashiya" (refer to image).
"Priest Kitataka" from the Hokuetsu Seppu
It was in the Tenshō period. At a funeral in the Uonuma District, Echigo Province, a sudden gust and a ball of fire came flying to it, and covered the coffin. Inside the ball of fire, was a giant cat with two tails, and it attempted to steal the coffin. This yōkai was repelled by the priest of Dontōan, Kitataka, by his incantation and a single strike of his nyoi, and the kesa of Kitagawa was afterwards called the "kasha-otoshi no kesa" (the kesa of the one who defeated a kasha).

Similar things
Things of the same kind as kasha, or things thought of as a different name for kasha, are as follows.

In Tōno, Iwate Prefecture, called "kyasha", at the mountain next to the pass that continued from the village of Ayaori, Kamihei District (now part of Tōno) to the village of Miyamori (now also part of Tōno), there lived a thing that took on the appearance of a woman who wore a kinchaku bag tied to her front, and it is said that it would steal corpses from coffins at funerals and dig up corpses from the gravesites and eat the corpses. In the village of Minamimimaki, Nagano Prefecture (now Saku), it is also called "kyasha," and like usual, it would steal corpses from funerals.

In the Yamagata Prefecture, a story is passed down where when a certain wealthy man died, a kasha-neko (カシャ猫 or 火車猫) appeared before him and attempted to steal his corpse, but the priest of Seigen-ji drove it away. What was then determined to have been its remaining tail was then presented to the temple of Hase-kannon as a charm against evil spirits, which is open to the public on new years each year.

In the village of Akihata, Kanra District, Gunma Prefecture (now Kanra), a monster that would eat human corpses are called "tenmaru", and in order to defend against this, the bamboo basket on top was protected.

In Himakajima, Aichi Prefecture, kasha are called madōkusha, and it is said that a cat that would reach one hundred years of age would become a yōkai.

In the Izumi region, Kagoshima Prefecture, called "kimotori", they are said to appear at the gravesite after funerals.

Development of the term and concept over time
Kasha literally means "burning cart" or "fiery chariot". During Japan's Middle Ages and early modern era, Kasha were depicted as a fiery chariot who took the dead away to hell, and were depicted as such in Buddhist writings, such as rokudo-e.  Kasha also appeared in Buddhist paintings of the era, notably jigoku-zōshi (Buddhist ‘hellscapes’, paintings depicting the horrors of hell), where they were depicted as flaming carts pulled by demons or oni. The tale of the kasha was used by the Buddhist leadership to persuade the populace to avoid sin.

It was said that during the funeral procession of a sinful man, the kasha would come for the body. When kasha arrived, they were accompanied by black clouds and a fearsome wind. These great winds would be strong enough to lift the coffin into the sky, out of the hands of those bearing it on their shoulders. When this occurred, the pallbearers would explain it as the body having been “possessed by the kasha”

The legends state that if a monk is present in the funeral procession, then the body could be reclaimed by the monk throwing a rosary at the coffin, saying a prayer, or signing their seal onto the coffin.  The remedy for a kasha corpse abduction varies by region and source. However, if no monk was present or no rosary thrown, then the coffin and body lying therein were taken away to hell. Alternatively, the body would be disrespected by the kasha by being savagely torn into pieces and hung on adjacent tree limbs or rocks.

Over time, the image of the kasha evolved from a chariot of fire to a corpse-stealing cat demon that appeared at funerals. It is not clear how or when the flaming cart demon and bakeneko were confounded, but in many cases, kasha are depicted as cat demons, often wreathed in flame. This has led to the modern-day conception of the kasha as one variety of bakeneko, or 'monster cats'.

There is some considerable discussion on the origin of the feline appearance of the modern kasha. Some believe that the kasha was given a feline appearance when the previous conception of the kasha was given the attributes of another corpse-robbing yokai, the Chinese Mōryō or wangliang. In the aforementioned "Bōsō Manroku", the characters 魍魎 were read "kuhashiya", in the essay Mimibukuro by Negishi Shizumori, in volume four "Kiboku no Koto" (鬼僕の事), there is a scene under the name, "The One Called Mōryō" (魍魎といへる者なり).

In Japan, from old times, cats were seen as possessing supernatural abilities, and there are legends such as "one must not let a cat get near a corpse" and "when a cat leaps over a coffin, the corpse inside the coffin will wake up." Also, in the collection of setsuwa tales, the Uji Shūi Monogatari from medieval Japan, a gokusotsu (an evil ogre that torments the dead in hell) would drag a burning hi no kuruma (wheel of fire), it is said that they would attempt to take away the corpses of sinners, or living sinners. It has thus been determined that the legend of the kasha was born as a result of the mixture of legends concerning cats and the dead, and the legend of the "hi no kuruma" that would steal away sinners.

Another popular viewpoint is that kasha were given the cat-like appearance after it was noted that in rare cases, cats will consume their deceased owners. This is a rather unusual occurrence, but there are recorded modern cases of this.

Another theory states that the legend of kappa making humans drown and eating their innards from their butts was born as a result of the influence of this kasha.

Re-usage of the term
The Japanese Idiom "hi no kuruma", an alternate reading of 火車, "kasha", meaning "to be in a difficult financial situation" or "to be strapped for cash", comes from how the dead would receive torture from the kasha on their journey to hell.

In the region of the Harima Province, old women with bad personalities are said to be called "kasha-baba" ("kasha old women"), with the nuance that they are old women that are like bakeneko.

How the yarite, the woman who controls the yūjo in the yūkaku, is called "kasha" (花車, "flower wheel") comes from this kasha, and as the yarite was the woman who managed everything, and how the word "yarite" is also used to indicate people who move bullock carts (gissha or gyūsha) also comes from this.

See also 
 Bakeneko
 Gazu Hyakki Yakō
 Maneki-neko
 Nekomata

References

External links 
 Short infos about Kashas (English)

Buddhist folklore
Yōkai
Mythological felines
Cats in Japan
Cat folklore